Nicole C. Rust is an American neuroscientist, psychologist, and an Associate Professor of Psychology at the University of Pennsylvania. She studies visual perception and visual recognition memory. She is  recognized for significant advancements in experimental psychology and neuroscience.

Rust was the recipient of the 2021 Troland Research Award from the National Academy of Sciences for her fundamental contributions to understanding how the cortex makes use of complex visual information to guide intelligent behavior. She was named a McKnight Foundation Scholar (2013), received an NSF CAREER Award (2013) and was named an Alfred P. Sloan Research Fellow (2010).

Education and early career 
Rust received her bachelor's degree in from the University of Idaho in 1997. She then went on to receive her PhD in Neuroscience from New York University in 2004 under the mentorship of J. Anthony Movshon, and Eero Simoncelli. There, her work focused on how the primate brain processes information about visual motion, including in the primary visual cortex and area MT.

Career and research
Rust completed postdoctoral research at the Massachusetts Institute of Technology between 2004 and 2006. There she worked under the mentorship of James DiCarlo, studying how the brain identifies the objects that are present in a visual scene.

Rust joined the faculty in the Department of Psychology at the University of Pennsylvania in 2009. Her lab has focused on understanding how the brain uses visual information to solve different tasks, including finding sought objects and remembering the images that have been encountered.

Rust's group also creates machine learning algorithms that mimic neural circuits of memory.

References 

Living people
University of Idaho alumni
New York University alumni
Massachusetts Institute of Technology alumni
University of Pennsylvania faculty
American neuroscientists
American women scientists
Year of birth missing (living people)
American women academics
21st-century American women